The Commander of the Defence Forces is the Chief of the Estonian Defence Forces and the national defence organisations.

List of Commander of the Defence Forces

|-style="text-align:center;"
|colspan=7|Vacant  Soviet occupation
|-

|-style="text-align:center;"
|colspan=7|Vacant  Soviet rule
|-

See also
 Kindral

Notes

References

Estonia
Estonian military leaders